is a prank performed by clasping the hands together in the shape of an imaginary gun and attempting to poke an unsuspecting victim's anus, often while exclaiming "Kan-CHO!". It is a common prank among children in East Asian countries such as Japan. In Korea, it is called . In China, it is popularly called , which was derived from the jutsu technique in the manga and anime series Naruto, in which it is known as 千年殺し (sennen goroshi, meaning "one thousand years of death"). In accordance with widespread practice, the word is generally written in katakana when used in its slang sense, and in kanji when used for enemas in the medical sense.

In English-speaking countries, the term “goosing” generally refers to a comparatively mild grabbing of the buttocks with the tips of the fingers and thumb in imitation of a harmless bite on the butt from a goose.  However, the kanchō prank may also be known as goosing.

See also 
 Boong-Ga Boong-Ga – video game which allows the player to engage in simulated kanchō
 Pantsing

References 

Anus
Bullying
Practical jokes
Sexual abuse